Reading Football Club is a professional football club based in Reading, Berkshire, England. The team play in the Championship, the second tier of the English football league system. The club is managed by Paul Ince.

Reading are nicknamed The Royals, due to Reading's location in the Royal County of Berkshire, though they were previously known as The Biscuitmen, due to the town's association with Huntley and Palmers. Established in 1871, the club is one of the oldest teams in England, but did not join The Football League until 1920, and first played in the top tier of English football league system in the 2006–07 season. The club competed in the 2012–13 Premier League season, having gained promotion at the end of the 2011–12 season after winning the Championship, but were relegated after just one season back in the top flight.

Reading won the 1987–88 Full Members' Cup and were one of only two Second Division clubs to lift the trophy. The club's best performance in the FA Cup was reaching the semi-finals which they achieved on two occasions: once in 1926-27 and again in 2014-15.

The club played at Elm Park for 102 years, from 1896 to 1998. In 1998, the club moved to the new Madejski Stadium, which is named after the club's former chairman Sir John Madejski. In 2021, the club announced that the ground would be known as the Select Car Leasing Stadium for the subsequent decade for sponsorship reasons.

The club holds the record for the number of successive league wins at the start of a season, with a total of 13 wins at the start of the 1985–86 Third Division campaign and also the record for the number of points gained in a professional league season with 106 points in the 2005–06 Football League Championship campaign. Reading then finished eighth in the 2006–07 Premier League, their first-ever season as a top-flight club.

History

Formation and gradual rise (1871–1991)
Reading were formed on 25 December 1871, following a public meeting at the Bridge Street Rooms organised by Joseph Edward Sydenham, who would go on to be club secretary. The early matches were played at Reading Recreation Ground, and later the club held fixtures at Reading Cricket Ground, Coley Park and Caversham Cricket Ground. The switch to professionalism in 1895 resulted in the need for a bigger ground and, to this end, the club moved again, to the purpose-built Elm Park on 5 September 1896. In 1913, Reading had a successful tour of Italy, prompting the leading sports newspaper Corriere della Sera to write "without doubt, Reading FC are the finest foreign team seen in Italy".

Reading were elected to the Football League Third Division South of the Football League in 1920. Reading's best performance in the FA Cup came in 1926–27 when they lost to eventual winners Cardiff City at Wolverhampton in the semi-final, a placement the club would not match again until 2015, when they lost to holders Arsenal in the semi-final. Reading lost their place in Division Two in May 1931, and remained in Third Division South until the outbreak of World War II. The club won the Southern Section Cup, beating Bristol City in the two-legged final in 1938, and when taking part in the regional London War League and Cup competitions, gained another honour by beating Brentford in the London War Cup Final of 1941 by 3–2 at Stamford Bridge.

When League football resumed after the war, Reading quickly came to prominence once again. The club's record victory, 10–2 versus Crystal Palace, was recorded in September 1946, and Reading twice finished runners-up in the Third (South), in 1948–49 and 1951–52, but they were denied a return to Division Two as only the champions were promoted. The side's moment of cup glory came in 1988 when they won the Simod Cup, beating a number of top-flight sides en route to their Wembley win over Luton Town. Reading were promoted to the Second Division as champions in 1986 under the management of Ian Branfoot, but were relegated back to the Third Division in 1988.

Onwards and upwards (1991–2005) 
The appointment of Mark McGhee as player-manager, shortly after the takeover by John Madejski, in 1991 saw Reading move forward. They were crowned champions of the new Division Two in 1994. Thirty-five-year-old striker Jimmy Quinn was put in charge of the first team alongside midfielder Mick Gooding and guided Reading to runners-up in the final Division One table – only to be denied automatic promotion because of the streamlining of the Premier League, from 22 teams to 20. In 1995, Reading had eased past Tranmere Rovers in the play-off semi-finals and looked to have booked their place in the Premier League only to lose 4-3 against Bolton Wanderers in the final having been 2-0 up and missed a penalty at half-time. Quinn and Gooding's contracts were not renewed two years later after Reading had slid into the bottom half of Division One. Their successor, Terry Bullivant, lasted less than a season before being sacked in March 1998. Reading were relegated back to Division Two at the end of the 1997-98 season.

The year 1998 also saw Reading move into the new 24,200 all-seater Madejski Stadium, named after chairman John Madejski. Tommy Burns had taken over from Terry Bullivant but lasted just 18 months before being replaced by Alan Pardew, who had previously been reserve team manager before being released. The club finished third in 2000–01 qualifying for the play-offs, losing 2–3 in the final against Walsall at the Millennium Stadium in Cardiff. Reading returned to Division One for 2002–03 after finishing runners-up in Division Two. The following season, they finished fourth in Division One and qualified for the play-offs, where they lost in the semi-final to Wolverhampton Wanderers. Alan Pardew moved to West Ham United the following October and was replaced by Steve Coppell.

Rise to the Premier League and yo-yo years (2005–2013)
Reading won the 2005–06 Championship with a league record 106 points, scoring 99 goals and losing only twice. They were promoted to English football's top division for the first time in their history. The 2006–07 season saw Reading make their first appearance in the top flight of English football. Reading defied pre-season predictions of relegation to finish the season in eighth place with 55 points. Reading turned down the chance to play in the UEFA Intertoto Cup. In the run up to their second season in the Premier League, Reading took part in the 2007 Peace Cup in South Korea. This second season was less successful, however, and Reading were relegated back to the Championship.

Reading started the 2008–09 season with a 15 match unbeaten home run. They finished fourth and qualify for the play-offs, where they lost to Burnley in the semi-final. Manager Steve Coppell resigned just hours after the game, replaced by Brendan Rodgers. Rodgers left the club by mutual consent on 16 December 2009 and Brian McDermott made caretaker manager the same day. In the 2010–11 FA Cup, Reading reached the quarter-final, where they lost 1–0 to Manchester City at Etihad Stadium, Reading eventually finished fifth in the Championship to qualify for the division's play-offs. After beating Cardiff City in the semi-finals, they lost 4–2 to Swansea City in the final at Wembley. In the 2011–12 season, a streak of good form in the second half of the season, ensured promotion to the Premier League on 17 April 2012 with 1–0 home win against Nottingham Forest.

McDermott led Reading to their first Premier League win of the 2012–13 season on 17 November 2012 at their 11th attempt, defeating Everton 2–1 at home. On 11 March 2013, however, he left his position at Reading. Nigel Adkins was then appointed as manager, though he was unable to save them from relegation after drawing Queens Park Rangers 0–0 on 28 April 2013 at Loftus Road.

Return to the Championship (2013–present)
The following season back in the Championship saw Reading make two high-profile signings in Wayne Bridge and Royston Drenthe in hope of an immediate return to the Premier League. Reading, however, missed out on the playoffs because of a last minute winner from Brighton & Hove Albion's Leonardo Ulloa, which meant the Seagulls made the playoffs at Reading's expense.

The summer before the 2014–15 season saw further arrivals of Jamie Mackie on loan, Oliver Norwood and the return of Simon Cox. The club was under a high threat of administration, causing departures of Sean Morrison and Adam Le Fondre and a Thai consortium taking over the club. A good start to Nigel Adkins' second season in charge was followed by a poor run of results that ended with his sacking after the 6–1 away defeat to Birmingham City with Steve Clarke taking over the next day in the hope of a promotion push. However, a lack of goals and some poor form in the league meant the club faced some fears of relegation to League One, but luckily safety was secured with few games to spare. Nonetheless, during that time, the club embarked on a successful FA Cup journey, reaching the semi-final where they were unlucky to lose 2–1 to Arsenal at Wembley. The following season saw the club bring in many players in the hopes of gaining promotion, however the club would finish in 17th.

In the summer leading up to the 2016–17 season the club announced the departure of Brian McDermott and eventually he was to be replaced by former Manchester United defender Jaap Stam. Under Stam, Reading achieved their highest finish since relegation back to the Championship by finishing third and reaching the play-offs, where they beat Fulham on aggregate before facing Huddersfield Town in the final at Wembley where they lost on penalties following 0–0 draw after extra time. However, the following season was a sharp contrast as the team were languished towards the bottom of the table for most of the season. On 21 March 2018, Stam resigned as manager after a nine-game winless run. Two days later, on 23 March 2018, Paul Clement was appointed as Reading's new manager, who finished the season in 20th place, avoiding relegation by three points.

The following season, Clement was sacked on 6 December 2018 after poor results left the club outside of the relegation zone only on goal difference. He was replaced by José Gomes on 22 December 2018, who steered the club away from relegation to finish 20th again. However, after a slow start to the 2019–20 season, Gomes was dismissed after less than a year in charge with the team in the relegation zone in October 2019. Sporting director Mark Bowen was promoted to the role as his replacement a week later, who lead the team to finish 14th before departing the club in August 2020.

Former Chicago Fire boss Veljko Paunović was appointed manager on 29 August 2020. The team got off to an excellent start to the 2020–21 season, winning seven of their first eight league games. However, the team's form faded after injuries to several key players and they eventually narrowly missed out of the playoffs, finishing seventh.

On 17 November 2021 it was confirmed Reading would be deducted 6 points due to breaching the EFL's profitability and sustainability rules.

Following a 3-2 away victory over Preston North End, Manager Veljko Paunović left his role by mutual consent, with Paul Ince being placed in interim charge of the club alongside Academy Manager Michael Gilkes. On 16 May 2022, Ince was announced as the team's permanent manager, with Mark Bowen also returning to the club in the role of Head of Football Operations. 

On 1 March 2023, British media reported that the team was facing another six-point deduction for breaching profitability and sustainability rules.

Crest and colours

The first crest to appear on a Reading kit was in 1953, it featured just the letter "R". There was no crest seen again until 1981 when there was a crest featuring three elm trees and the rivers Thames and Kennet; this only lasted two seasons. From 1987 to 1996 the crest used the new kit colours of yellow, sky blue, royal blue and white. A brief return to a design based on the 1981 crest was reintroduced for the 1996–97 and 1997–98 seasons. Commenting on the need for a new crest to coincide with the move to the Madejski Stadium, as well as moving into the new millennium, Sir John Madejski said: "I know some traditionalists will say we should keep the old badge but they should bear in mind the need to move forward." The current crest was first seen on the kits for the 1998–99 season. It is based on the club colours—blue and white—and includes a crown to represent the Royal County of Berkshire and the Maiwand Lion to represent Reading.

The club's home kit for the 2022–23 season saw University of Reading's Ed Hawkins' stripe design included on the sleeves with the stripes representing the average temperature for a single year since Reading's foundation to raise awareness for climate change, the shirt itself being made of recycled plastic bottles.

Stadium

The club played at Reading Recreation Ground until 1878, before moving on to Reading Cricket Ground (1878–1882), Coley Park (1882–1889) and Caversham Cricket Ground (1889–1896).

In 1889, Reading were unable to continue playing at Coley Park as W B Monck (the local squire) no longer allowed football due to "rowdyism [by] the rougher elements". With club membership exceeding 300 by the time the club went professional in 1895, Reading required a proper ground. A meeting the following year determined that funding would be difficult. £20 was donated by J C Fidler, on the proviso that "no liquors were to be sold" on site. The rest of the cost was financed through donations by wealthy supporters, as well as one large individual donation. A former gravel pit in West Reading was identified as the site. The first game at Elm Park was held on 5 September 1896 between Reading and A Roston Bourke's XI. The visitors were a scratch team from Holloway College. £44 was taken on the gate, with an attendance of approximately 2,500.

In 1908, the club's annual general meeting proposed moving to a new ground near Reading railway station. A board meeting the following year decided that the move would not be possible, as "there was no chance of a move to the ground near to the GWR railway stations due to the actions of the Great Western Railway".

In 1994, the Taylor Report made an all-seater stadium compulsory in the top two divisions (the Premier League and the first division). Reading were champions of the second division in 1994, and were promoted to the first division. Reading became subject to the Taylor requirements, though converting Elm Park to an all-seater stadium would have been impractical. Instead, a location in Smallmead (to the south of the town) was identified as the site for a new stadium. The former council landfill site was bought for £1, with further conditions that the development of the stadium would include part-funding of the A33 relief road. Expansion of the club's home would also allow alternative commercial ventures (particularly leisure facilities) and shared use with other teams (such as rugby union clubs Richmond and London Irish). The last competitive match at Elm Park took place on 3 May 1998 against Norwich City, with Reading losing 1–0. Reading began the 1998–99 season at the Madejski Stadium. It was opened on 22 August 1998 when Luton Town were beaten 3–0. The stadium cost more than £50 million to build. For the first time in its history, Reading Football Club participated in the Premier League in the 2006–07 season. As a result of the sell-out crowds for their first few fixtures of the season, the club announced their intention, in October 2006, to make a planning application to extend the ground to between 37,000 and 38,000 seats. The application was made on 24 January 2007, proposing initially the extension of the East Stand with a further 6,000 seats (raising capacity to around 30,000) and subsequently extension of the North and South Stands to reach the full proposed capacity. On 24 May 2007, it was announced that planning permission had been granted to extend the stadium to a capacity of 36,900. Reading has made plans for a new training ground at Bearwood Golf Club to replace Hogwood park their current training facility.

On 5 July 2016, at the end of Eamonn Dolan's funeral, Reading announced that the North Stand would be renamed the Eamonn Dolan Stand.

Support

In 1930, the Reading Football Supporters’ Club (RFSC) was formed to represent the interests of supporters of the club and to assist in raising funds for the football club. On 18 March 2002, the Supporters' Trust at Reading become the official successor to the RFSC.

In 2001, Reading became the first football club to register their fans as an official member of their squad, giving the "player" registered with squad number 13 as 'Reading Fans'.

For the 2015–16 season, Reading had 12,983 season ticket holders – ranked 10th in the Championship and almost identical to former league champions Leeds United. The figure for that season was greater than the 12,552 recorded in the previous season, but down from the 2013–14 Championship peak of 14,547. The average attendance for the 2015–16 season was 17,570 – the 10th highest in the Championship.

Rivalries
Before going out of business in 1992, Aldershot were Reading's biggest rivals. Aldershot were, geographically, the closest Football League club to Reading. There was a strong rift between the two sets of fans, with fighting between fans occurring on several occasions. Strong feelings remain between fans of Reading and fans of Aldershot Town, the refounded club in Aldershot. Aldershot Town were promoted into the Football League in 2008, but the clubs haven't met in a competitive match since the demise of the original club. Aldershot were relegated out of the league in 2013, having entered administration, reducing the chances of a competitive meeting between the two sides in the near future.

Since Aldershot's exile, Reading's main local rivalries have been with Oxford United and Swindon Town. When the three teams had shared a division, their rivalry was referred to as the "Didcot Triangle". However, the rivalry between Oxford and Swindon is stronger than between either of the two and Reading, largely due to them both spending their recent history in lower divisions than Reading, and spending their previous history in higher divisions than Reading. In 2012, a small survey showed that Reading's main rivals were Aldershot Town, followed by Swindon Town and Oxford United.

Sponsorship

Additional kit sponsors
During the 2013–14 season and 2014–15 season the Marussia F1 logo was on the back of the shirts as part of a sponsorship deal between former Russian owner Anton Zingarevich and Russian owned Marussia F1. This deal continued until the team entered administration in October 2014. The sponsorship deal ended despite the team surviving and racing in the 2015 Formula One season. During the 2015–16 season, Waitrose was on the back of the home shirt whilst Euro Cake was on the back of the away shirt, meanwhile Legend Alliance sponsored the shorts for the season. Waitrose and Euro Cake sponsored the home and away kits respectively again for the 2016–17 season. Cherwell Software took sponsorship of the back of the home shirt for the 2017–18 season while Euro Cake sponsored the back of the away shirt again for the third consecutive season. Reading confirmed Singaporean international financial technology firm and digital wallet specialist Rapidz as its ‘Back of Shirt’ sponsor for 2020–21.

Ownership and finances

Reading Football Club ownership structure:
 75% Owned by Renhe Sports Management Ltd, 10% owned by Xiu Li Dai and Yongge Dai
 25% Owned by Narin Niruttinanon

Players

First-team squad

Out on loan

Under-21 squad

Under-18 squad

Club officials and management

Managers

Records and statistics

Records

 Highest league finish: 8th in Premier League, 2006–07
 Best FA Cup performance: Semi-finals, 1926–27, 2014–15
 Best League Cup performance: Quarter-finals, 1995–96, 1997–98
 Biggest win: 10–2 v. Crystal Palace (4 September 1946, Football League Third Division South)
 Heaviest defeat: 18–0 v. Preston North End (27 January 1894, FA Cup 1st round)
 Longest winning sequence at the start of a season: 13 victories in 1985–86.

 Most points in a single season in any English professional league: 106 points (2005–06)
 Longest winless sequence at the start of a season (club record): 6 (2 draws and 4 defeats), (2018–19)
Fastest goal in a competitive game (club record), 55th fastest in association football: 9.55 seconds (Yakou Méïté; 2020–21)

Notable players
In 1999, Reading commissioned a poll of the supporters' 'Player of the Millennium' to determine the club's best ever player.

Appearances

Most appearances: Martin Hicks (603; 1978–1991)
Most league appearances: Martin Hicks (500; 1978–1991)

The following players have played more than 398 times for Reading, in all competitions.

Goalscorers

Most goals: Trevor Senior (191; 1983–1987, 1988–1992)
Most goals in a season: Trevor Senior (41; 1983–84)
Most league goals: Ronnie Blackman (158; 1947–1954)
Most league goals in a season: Ronnie Blackman (39; 1951–52)
Most league goals in a game: Arthur Bacon (6 vs. Stoke City; 1930–31)
Most penalties: Ray Reeves (21)

The following players have scored more than 85 times for Reading, in all competitions.

Goalkeeping

Longest time without conceding a goal: Steve Death (1,103 minutes; 1978–79; former English league record)

Other records

Reading hold the record for the number of successive league wins at the start of a season, with a total of 13 wins at the start of the 1985–86 Third Division campaign and also the record for the number of points gained in a professional league season with 106 points in the 2005–06 Football League Championship campaign. Reading finished champions of their division on both of these occasions.

The club's largest win was a 10–2 victory over Crystal Palace on 4 September 1946 in the Football League Third Division South. Reading's heaviest loss was an 18–0 defeat against Preston North End in the FA Cup 1st round on 27 January 1894. Reading have lost the two highest-scoring matches in the history of the Premier League; Portsmouth 7–4 Reading on 29 September 2007, and Tottenham Hotspur 6–4 Reading on 29 December 2007, as well as losing the highest-scoring League Cup game, Reading 5–7 Arsenal on 30 October 2012.

The player with the most league appearances is Martin Hicks, with 500 from 1978 to 1991. The most capped player to play for Reading is Chris Gunter, who has currently won 62 caps for Wales since being a Reading player since July 2012. The most league goals in total and in a season are held by Ronnie Blackman with 158 from 1947 to 1954 and 39 in 1951–52 respectively. The player with the most league goals in a game is Arthur Bacon with six against Stoke City in 1930–31. The first Reading-based player to play in the FIFA World Cup was Bobby Convey in 2006 with the United States. The record time for a goalkeeper not conceding a goal is held by Steve Death at 1,103 minutes in 1978–79, which is a former English league record in itself.

Reading's highest attendance at Elm Park was in 1927, when 33,042 spectators watched Reading defeat Brentford 1–0. The highest attendance at the Madejski Stadium is 24,184 for the Premier League game with Everton on 17 November 2012.

The highest transfer fee received for a Reading player is the £6.6 million 1899 Hoffenheim paid for Gylfi Sigurðsson on 31 August 2010.

Gylfi Sigurðsson and Samúel Friðjónsson became the first players from the Reading academy to feature in a World Cup squad by being named by Iceland for the 2018 FIFA World Cup. Gylfi Sigurðsson went on to become the first academy graduate to score at the World Cup in Iceland's 2–1 defeat to Croatia on 26 June 2018, after becoming the first academy graduate to play in the World Cup with his appearance against Argentina on 16 June 2018.

Captains (21st century)

Player of the season

International players

Former players

Honours

League
 English second tier (currently Championship)
Champions (2): 2005–06, 2011–12
Runners-up (1): 1994–95
 English third tier (currently League One)
Champions (3): 1925–26, 1985–86, 1993–94
Runners-up (5): 1931–32, 1934–35, 1948–49, 1951–52, 2001–02
 English fourth tier (currently League Two)
Champions (1): 1978–79

Cup
Full Members Cup
Winners (1): 1987–88
London War Cup
Winners (1): 1941
Football League Third Division South Cup
Winners (1): 1938

Youth and reserve
Premier League Cup
Winners (1): 2014
Runners-up (1): 2017
Berks & Bucks Senior Cup
Winners (4): 1879, 1892, 1995, 2022
Runners-up (5): 1941, 1997, 1998, 2000, 2019

Managerial
LMA Manager of the Year
Steve Coppell: 2005–06, 2006–07
LMA Championship Manager of the Year
Brian McDermott: 2011–12

Women's team

In May 2006, Reading launched the Reading FC Women's team. They used to play in the FA Premier League Southern Division. From 2014, Reading FC Women played in the FA Women's Super League 2 until they won promotion to the FA Women's Super League 1 in 2015 after winning the league. In the 2017–18 season, they finished fourth in the Women's Super League – their highest league position to date. The team currently plays at Adams Park, home of Wycombe Wanderers.

References

Bibliography

External links

 
 Supporters' Trust At Reading
 

 
Association football clubs established in 1871
Football
Premier League clubs
English Football League clubs
Southern Football League clubs
1871 establishments in England
Football clubs in Berkshire
Football clubs in England